[[File:Uplinkdownpp.svg|thumb|250px|{{center|Principle of AMS(OR)S}}]] 

 Aeronautical mobile-satellite (OR)°° service (short: AMS(R)S;  | also: aeronautical mobile-satellite (R) radiocommunication service) is – according to Article 1.37 of the International Telecommunication Union's (ITU) Radio Regulations (RR) – defined as «An aeronautical mobile-satellite service reserved for communications relating to safety and regularity of flights, primarily outside national or international civil air routes.»

See also 

Classification
This radiocommunication service is classified in accordance with ITU Radio Regulations (article 1) as follows: 
Mobile service (article 1.24)
Aeronautical mobile service (article 1.32)
Aeronautical mobile-satellite service (article 1.35)
Aeronautical mobile-satellite (R)° service (article 1.36)
Aeronautical mobile-satellite (OR)°° service (article 1.37)
(R)° – abbreviation to route flights (route) (OR)°° – abbreviation to flights others than on routes (off-route)

Frequency allocation
The allocation of radio frequencies is provided according to Article 5'' of the ITU Radio Regulations (edition 2012).

In order to improve harmonisation in spectrum utilisation, the majority of service-allocations stipulated in this document were incorporated in national Tables of Frequency Allocations and Utilisations which is with-in the responsibility of the appropriate national administration. The allocation might be primary, secondary, exclusive, and shared.

primary allocation: is indicated by writing in capital letters
secondary allocation: is indicated by small letters 
exclusive or shared utilization: is within the responsibility of administrations

References / sources 

 International Telecommunication Union (ITU)

Mobile services ITU
Airbands
Air traffic control